is a ceremony where a  (an aspiring geisha) becomes a  (an apprentice geisha) and officially begins their career. The  is guided around her local area to call on businesses, teachers, and other  by her 's  (male dresser) to thank her teachers and peers for their support and to let them know of her debut.

 are usually 17 or 18 when this ceremony takes place as post-WWII labor laws prevent  from beginning their employment as apprentices at an earlier age as in pre-WWII eras. Some apprentices, however, skip the  stage, being too old to debut as a young apprentice, and instead begin their apprenticeship appearing as a geisha.

Attire
Because the debut is considered one of the most important moments of a geisha's career, only the most formal attire is worn.

 
 The  is a traditional hairstyle worn by junior . For , apprentices wear formal hair ornaments made out of tortoise shell, silver and red , and two .
 
Though it is usually applied by the wearer, because of the importance of the  ceremony, a professional will apply the makeup. 
 
 A  (a trailing black kimono with five crests) is a formal black trailing kimono decorated with five crests of the 's , placed on the centre back, the back of the sleeves, and the front shoulders.  are usually  in length, with a padded hem to aid the skirt in trailing across the floor. When outside, a  will hold her  up with her hands or tie it in place so that it does not touch the ground.
 
For formal occasions,  wear a gold brocade .

See also

References

Bibliography
 

Geisha